Curtis Barnard Thigpen (born April 19, 1983) is an American former professional baseball catcher. He played parts of two seasons in Major League Baseball (MLB) with the Toronto Blue Jays.

Amateur career
Thigpen spent his college career at the University of Texas and won the College World Series in 2002 during which he was named to the All-Tournament Team. In 2003, he played collegiate summer baseball in the Cape Cod Baseball League for the Yarmouth-Dennis Red Sox and was named a league all-star. Thigpen was selected by the Blue Jays in the second round of the 2004 Major League Baseball Draft with the 57th overall pick.

Minor league career
In 2007, he started the season playing for the Syracuse Chiefs, the Triple-A affiliate of the Toronto Blue Jays.

Major league career

Toronto Blue Jays
Thigpen was called up from the minors on June 5, and made his major league debut on June 6, 2007, at Rogers Centre in Toronto against the Tampa Bay Devil Rays. He started at first base and finished the game 1-for-4. After the 2007 season, he finished hitting .238 with 11 RBIs, a .294 on-base percentage and a .287 slugging percentage over 47 games. During the 2008 season, Thigpen saw less playing time with Rod Barajas coming to Toronto. On September 26, 2008, Thigpen hit his first and only home run—in what would turn out to be the final at-bat of his major league career. He finished the season hitting .176 with one home run and one RBI.

On February 4, Thigpen was designated for assignment to clear a roster spot for newly acquired pitcher Brian Burres.  On February 6, Thigpen was sent outright to the Blue Jays' AAA affiliate, the Las Vegas 51s.

Oakland Athletics 
On March 27, 2009, Thigpen was traded to the Oakland Athletics in exchange for a player to be named later or cash considerations. He was released in April 2010.

Post-playing career
Thigpen and former Longhorns teammate J. B. Cox returned to the Texas Longhorns as volunteer student assistants in 2010. Thigpen then went on to work as a commercial lender at R Bank Texas from September 5, 2012 until January 15, 2014.

References

External links

Minorleaguebaseball.com
Bluejays.com

1983 births
Living people
American expatriate baseball players in Canada
Auburn Doubledays players
Baseball players from Dallas
Lansing Lugnuts players
Major League Baseball catchers
Major League Baseball first basemen
Syracuse Chiefs players
Syracuse SkyChiefs players
Texas Longhorns baseball players
Toronto Blue Jays players
Yarmouth–Dennis Red Sox players
Waterloo Bucks players